The  is a former class of steam locomotives operated in Japan. The class was the first type in Japan to use the 4-6-4 "Hudson" wheel arrangement. A total of 33 locomotives were built between 1947 and 1949 and designed by Hideo Shima, (one in 1947, 19 in 1948, and 13 in 1949). The locomotives were not built entirely from new, however, but used the boilers from former D51 2-8-2 "Mikado" freight locomotives.

The immediate post-war years saw a dramatic decline in freight, while at the same time passenger traffic once again surged, requiring a programme to rapidly build new passenger locos (classes C57 and C58) as well as rebuilding passenger locos from former freight types (classes C61 and C62). These nominal conversions were also seen as a way of bypassing the difficulties in obtaining approval from GHQ (or Supreme Commander for the Allied Powers) for building completely new locomotives at the time.

The locomotives were notable in being the first in Japan to incorporate automatic stokers.
The first eighteen locos delivered were allocated to Utsunomiya and Sendai depots to work express passenger duties on the Tōhoku Main Line. Nine locos were allocated to Oku and Mito depots to work on Jōban Line duties, and six locos were delivered to Tosu depot in Kyūshū to work on the Kagoshima Main Line. With the spread of electrification together with the influx of C59s displaced from Tōkaidō Main Line duties, the C61s found themselves gradually pushed further north to Morioka and Aomori depots. In later years, they were to be seen at the head of the newly inaugurated Hakutsuru limited express (between Sendai and Aomori) and the Hayabusa blue train (between Hakata and Kagoshima).
With the completion of electrification from Morioka to Aomori in October 1968, the six last remaining C61s were moved to Aomori depot where they worked on the Ōu Mainline between Akita and Aomori. The six Kagoshima-based locos originally delivered new to Kyūshū were withdrawn, but the six remaining Tōhoku locos were transferred to Miyazaki depot in October 1971 to work on the Nippō Main Line between Miyazaki and Kagoshima. They worked there until finally being withdrawn in 1974.

Specifications

Fleet details
()

Preserved examples

 C61 2 (formerly D51 1109) - Umekōji Steam Locomotive Museum in Kyoto (in working condition)
 C61 18 (formerly D51 874) - Front section only preserved privately in Yatsushiro, Kumamoto
 C61 19 (formerly D51 1027) - Shiroyama Park in Kokubu, Kagoshima
 C61 20 (formerly D51 1094) - JR-East Takasaki, Gunma (Operating condition - April 2011)

See also
 Japan Railways locomotive numbering and classification
JNR Class C60
JNR Class C62

References

Steam locomotives of Japan
4-6-4 locomotives
1067 mm gauge locomotives of Japan
Preserved steam locomotives of Japan
Railway locomotives introduced in 1947
Passenger locomotives